The Type 815, as well as its derivatives Type 815G and Type 815A, are Chinese electronic surveillance ships in service with the People's Liberation Army Navy (PLAN). Type 815 spy ship has received NATO reporting name Dongdiao class (meaning East Investigation), while its successors Type 815G & 815A have received NATO reporting name Dongdiao II class.

Type 815
Type 815 was designed to be a follow-on for earlier Type 813, but the latter did not immediately retire after the former has been commissioned, and both types served together until Type 813 was finally retired from PLAN and transferred to Chinese Coast Guard and converted to PRCCGS # 3469 cutter. Type 815 was formerly named as Dong-Diao (东调, meaning "East Investigate") (Pennant #232), but subsequently, the name was changed to Polaris after new naming convention adopted by PLAN. After entering service in the latter half of 1999, the ship went through major upgrade several years later, with parabolic antennas replaced by three large radomes. In addition to collecting electronic intelligence, this class is also tasked to perform ballistic missile tracking. There is a hangar for a helicopter. Specification:
Length (m): 130
Width (m): 16.4
Draft (m): 6.5
Displacement (t): 6000
Speed (kt): 20
Crew: 250
Propulsion: diesel engine
Armament: 1 twin 37 mm, 2 twin 25 mm

Type 815G
In 2009 an improved version appeared, designated as Type 815G, and the most obvious external visual difference between Type 815G and earlier Type 815 is that the former has a different mast somewhat similar to a pagoda shape, and the sheer line is curved at a greater angle.

Type 815A
In January 2017, an improved Type 815G entered service with Chinese navy. Designated as Type 815A, this further improved Type 815 can be visually distinguished from earlier Type 815G in the radome above the pilothouse: the radome of Type 815A is a cylinder with flat top surface, while the top of cylinder radome of earlier Type 815G has a semi-sphere.

Operations
The Type 815 is the most common spy ship deployed off the Taiwan Strait. Beginning in 2017, at least one Type 815G ship has been used to monitor each of the biennial Talisman Saber military exercises in northern Australia; in 2021, two such vessels, the Tianwangxing and Haiwangxing, were deployed.

In May 2022 the Haiwangxing conducted surveillance operations from Australia’s waters in the Northwest, coming at one point within 50 nautical miles of the Harold E Holt naval communications station in what the Australian defence minister said was an “an act of aggression”

References

Auxiliary surveillance ship classes
Auxiliary ships of the People's Liberation Army Navy